Eswatini, then known as Swaziland, was allocated the country code +268 by the International Telecommunication Union, in the late 1960s.
To call a telephone number in Eswatini, the following format is used:
yy xx xxxxcalls from within Eswatini
+268 yy xx xxxxcalls from outside Eswatini

List of allocations

Changes as of March 2010 
Subscriber numbers were extended by a digit with '2' prepended to fixed numbers and '7' to mobile/GSM numbers.

Expanded mobile numbers (+268 6xxxxxx) took effect 1 March 2010. Old dialling format was allowed until the mandatory date of 1 June 2010.

Fixed numbers were expanded on 1 February 2011, postponed from the previously scheduled 1 August 2010, with mandatory use on 1 May 2011 (previously scheduled 1 November 2010).

List of prefixes in Eswatini

Calls to and from neighbouring countries 
Until the 1990s, Swaziland was integrated into the South African telephone numbering plan; calls from South Africa to Swaziland were made using the code 0194. Calls to South Africa from Swaziland, however, required the use of the regional code 07. Calls to Lesotho were similarly made using the regional code 05 while those to Mozambique were made using the code 06.

References

Eswatini
Telecommunications in Eswatini
Telephone numbers